William Jeremiah Lunde (born November 18, 1975) is an American professional golfer who currently plays on the PGA Tour.

Lunde was born in San Diego, California. He played at the University of Nevada, Las Vegas and was part of the 1998 team that won the NCAA Championship. He turned professional in 1998.

Lunde played on the Nationwide Tour in 2004, 2005, and 2008. After two years in the Nationwide Tour, in 2005 Lunde gave up on the game and spent a year working in sales with the Las Vegas Founders, the group that ran the PGA Tour stop in Las Vegas, and then tried real estate. He got back into the game through the Butch Harmon Vegas Tour, where he earned a spot on the Nationwide Tour in 2008. During his 2008 season, he won the Nationwide Children's Hospital Invitational and finished fifth on the 2008 Nationwide Tour money list, thus earning his PGA Tour card for 2009. In 2010 he won his first PGA Tour event - the Turning Stone Resort Championship. Since his win, Lunde has alternated between the PGA Tour and Web.com Tour.

Lunde has also played on several mini-tours.

Amateur wins (1)
1998 Monroe Invitational

Professional wins (2)

PGA Tour wins (1)

Nationwide Tour wins (1)

Results in major championships

CUT = missed the half-way cut
"T" = tied
Note: Lunde never played in the Masters Tournament or The Open Championship.

Results in The Players Championship

CUT = missed the halfway cut

Results in World Golf Championships

"T" = Tied

See also
2008 Nationwide Tour graduates
2014 Web.com Tour Finals graduates

References

External links

American male golfers
UNLV Rebels men's golfers
PGA Tour golfers
Korn Ferry Tour graduates
Golfers from San Diego
Golfers from Nevada
Sportspeople from Las Vegas
1975 births
Living people